2014 Shenzhen Open – Singles may refer to:

2014 ATP Shenzhen Open – Singles
2014 WTA Shenzhen Open – Singles

See also 

2014 Shenzhen Open